Wildman may refer to:

People

Surname
 Bud Wildman (born 1946), Canadian politician
 Don Wildman (born 1961), American television show host
 George Wildman (born 1927), American cartoonist
 Henry Wildman (1838-?), convict transported to Australia whose false claims of having found gold led to an expedition to the area
 Herbert Wildman (1912-1989), American water polo goalkeeper in the 1932 and 1936 Olympics
 John Wildman (actor) (born 1960), Canadian actor
 John Wildman (c. 1621-1693), English politician and soldier
 Mark Wildman (singer), English bass and professor at the Royal Academy of Music
 Mark Wildman (born 1936), English snooker and pool commentator and retired snooker and English billiards player
 James Beckford Wildman (1789-1867), English politician and Jamaican plantation owner
 Michael Wildman British actor
 Peter Wildman (born 1950), Canadian actor and comic
 Rounsevelle Wildman (1864–1901), American writer and U.S. consul in Hong Kong
 Sam Wildman (1912-2004), Professor of Biology at the University of California, Los Angeles
 Scott Wildman, California State Assemblyman from 1996 to 2000
 Stephen Wildman (born 1951), Professor of the History of Art at the University of Lancaster
 Steven S. Wildman, American communications academic and researcher
 Thomas Wildman (1787-1859), British Army colonel, draftsman and landowner
 Wesley Wildman, Australian-American philosopher, theologian, ethicist and academic
 William Wildman (footballer) (1883-?), English footballer
 William Beauchamp Wildman, teacher and historian
 Zalmon Wildman (1775-1835), American politician
 Benjamin Wildman-Tobriner (born 1984), American 2008 Gold Medal Olympic swimmer and former world record holder

Nicknames
 Steve Brill, American foraging expert known as "Wildman"
 Wildman Whitehouse (1816-1890), English surgeon and unsuccessful chief electrician of the transatlantic telegraph cable for the Atlantic Telegraph Company

Fictional characters
 Sir Lawrence (Larry) Wildman, in the 1987 film Wall Street
 Naomi Wildman, on the television series Star Trek: Voyager
 Samantha Wildman, on Star Trek: Voyager

Other uses
 Wildman River, Northern Territory, Australia
 Wild man, a prominent Mardi Gras Indians character who usually carries a symbolic weapon

See also
 Rev. Donald Wildmon
 Wild man